EQT Ventures is the venture capital business of Swedish investment manager EQT AB Group. In May 2016, EQT Ventures announced its first €566m fund that makes minority equity investments in European and US tech companies ranging between €1 million and €50 million.

Investments made include:

See also   
 List of venture capital firms

References

External links
 

Companies based in Stockholm
Investment companies of Sweden